The following is an incomplete list of current and defunct magazines published in Sweden. They may be published in Swedish or in other languages.

A

 Acne Paper
 Affärsvärlden
 Akademikern
 Åkeri & Entreprenad
 Aktiespararen
 Aktuellt i Politiken
 Allas
 Allt om Historia
Allt om Kök och Bad
 Allt om Resor
 Amelia
 Äntligen Hemma
 Arbetarhistoria
 Arbetet
 Arbetsliv
 Arena
 Året Runt
Ars Interpres
Artes
 ATL Lantbrukets Affärstidning
 Axess magasin

B

 Bahro Suryoyo
Bang
Barn
Det Bästa
Båtliv
  Bildjournalen
Bilsport
Bilsport Classic
Biotech Sweden
Bobo
Brand
Buffé
Byggnadsarbetaren

C
Café
 Chef
 Clarté
Cosmopolitan (Swedish edition)
 Civilekonomen

D
Dagens Arbete
 Dagny
 Damernas Värld
 Direkt Aktion

E
Elle (Swedish edition)
 Entreprenadaktuellt
Expo

F

 Femina
Fighter Magazine
 Filmjournalen 
 Filter 
 Fokus
Frida
 Frisinnad Tidskrift
 Forskning och framsteg
 Fronesis

G
 Glänta
 Grönköpings Veckoblad

H

Handelsnytt
Hänt Bild
Hänt Extra
 Häpna!
 Häst&Ryttare
Hem Ljuva Hem
Hem Ljuva Hem Trädgård
Hem i Sverige
 Hemmets Journal
  Hemmets Veckotidning
Hennes
 Hundsport

I

 Icakuriren
 Idrottsbladet
 Illustrerad Vetenskap
Internetworld

J

 Jefferson Blues Magazine
 Jordbruksaktuellt
 Journalisten
 Judisk Krönika
 Judisk Tidskrift

K
 Kamratposten
Kommunalarbetaren
 Kyrkans Tidning

L
Land Lantbruk
Lärarnas Tidning
lön & jobb
 Lyckoslanten

M
 MagazineSweden
mama
 Miljöaktuellt

N

 Neue Rundschau
 Nordens Frihet
 Nöjesguiden
 Ny Tid
 Nya Affärer
 Det Nya Sverige

O-Ö

 OBS!
 Offside
Okej
 OmVärlden
Öppet Hus
 Ord och Bild

P

Paletten
Pedagogiska Magasinet
Pietisten
Plaza Interiör
Plaza Kvinna
 Populär Historia
 Position
 Privata Affärer 
Power Magazine
PRO Pensionären
PS!
 Puss

R

 Resultat
 Resumé
Ridsport
 Rotary Norden
Röda Korsets Tidning

S

 Salt 
Samefolket
Scanorama
Science Illustrated
 Se
Se & Hör
SEKO magasinet
 Shortcut
Siftidningen
 Skogsaktuellt
 Skolvärlden
SKTF-tidningen
Slitz
Solo
Stella
Stockholms Figaro
 Storm
 Stormklockan
Straight
Super PLAY
 Svensk Damtidning
Svensk Golf
Svensk Jakt
Svensk Jakt Nyheter
 Sverigemagasinet
Sunt Förnuft

T

 Tara
 Teknikens Värld
 Teknisk Tidskrift
 Then Swänska Argus
 Tiden
 Tidevarvet
Turist
 Tvärsnitt

V

Vagabond
Vår bostad
Veckans Affärer
Veckans Vimmel
Vecko-Journalen
Veteranen
Vi
Villaägaren

W
Wheels Magazine

Z
 Zionisten

See also
Media in Sweden
List of Swedish newspapers

References

Sweden
Magazines